Bottego's shrew (Crocidura bottegi) is a species of mammal in the family Soricidae.

Sources
 Hutterer, R. & Lavrenchenko, L. 2004.  Crocidura bottegi.   2006 IUCN Red List of Threatened Species.   Downloaded on 30 July 2007.

Bottego's shrew
Mammals of Ethiopia
Bottego's shrew
Bottego's shrew
Taxonomy articles created by Polbot